Salem Heights is a census-designated place (CDP) in Anderson Township, Hamilton County, Ohio, United States, adjacent to the city of Cincinnati. The population of Salem Heights was 3,862 at the 2020 census.

Geography
The Cincinnati neighborhood of Mount Washington is directly to the north. The census-designated place of Fruit Hill lies to the east, and to the south are Interstate 275 and the Ohio River.

Demographics

References

Census-designated places in Hamilton County, Ohio
Census-designated places in Ohio